Back on the Block is a 1989 studio album produced by Quincy Jones. The album features legendary musicians and singers from across three generations, including Ella Fitzgerald, Miles Davis, Joe Zawinul, Ice-T, Big Daddy Kane, Sarah Vaughan, Dizzy Gillespie, George Benson, Luther Vandross, Dionne Warwick, Barry White, Chaka Khan, Take 6, Bobby McFerrin, Al Jarreau, Al B. Sure!, James Ingram, El DeBarge, Ray Charles and a 12-year-old Tevin Campbell.

Overview 
Multiple singles were lifted from the album and found success on Pop and R&B radio, including "I'll Be Good to You", "I Don't Go for That", "The Secret Garden (Sweet Seduction Suite)", and "Tomorrow (A Better You, Better Me)" which was originally an instrumental track on the Brothers Johnson's Look Out for #1 set. "Tomorrow" is also noteworthy for introducing a young Tevin Campbell to the music scene. Back on the Block won the 1991 Grammy Award for Album of the Year. Jones' track, "Setembro (of brazilian composers Gilson Peranzzetta and Ivan Lins)" was featured on the soundtrack of the 1991 film, Boyz n the Hood.  Back on the Block topped the R&B Albums chart at number-one for twelve weeks, and topped the Contemporary Jazz Albums chart as well.

Ella Fitzgerald and Sarah Vaughan 
Back on the Block featured the last studio recordings of jazz singers Ella Fitzgerald and Sarah Vaughan.

Fitzgerald and Jones had previously worked together on her 1963 album with Count Basie, Ella and Basie!. Jones had produced three albums with Sarah Vaughan when they both worked for Mercury Records.

Grammy Awards 
At the 33rd Grammy Awards, Back on the Block won seven Grammy Awards, including the Grammy Award for Album of the Year.

In arranging, Jerry Hey, Quincy Jones, Ian Prince and Rod Temperton won the Grammy Award for Best Instrumental Arrangement for "Birdland", and Glen Ballard, Hey, Jones and Clif Magness won the Grammy Award for Best Instrumental Arrangement Accompanying Vocal(s) for "The Places You Find Love".

Jones also won the Grammy Award for Best Jazz Fusion Performance for "Birdland", and the Grammy Award for Producer of the Year, Non-Classical.

Bruce Swedien won the Grammy Award for Best Engineered Album, Non-Classical for his work on the album.

Ray Charles and Chaka Khan won the Grammy Award for Best R&B Performance by a Duo or Group with Vocal for "I'll Be Good To You".

The Grammy Award for Best Rap Performance by a Duo or Group went to Big Daddy Kane, Ice-T, Kool Moe Dee, Melle Mel, Quincy Jones III and Jones for "Back on the Block".

Track listing 
All tracks produced by Quincy Jones and Rod Temperton. ”Tomorrow (A Better You, A Better Me)” co-produced by Jerry Hey.

Charts

Weekly charts

Certifications

Personnel 
Adapted credits from the liner notes of Back on the Block.

 Quincy Jones – lead vocals (track 1), choir conductor (7), handclaps (2, 6, 9), drums (6), drum machine (2), M1 pads (10)
 Gerald Albright – alto saxophone solo (tracks 10, 12)
 Nadirah Ali – background vocals (track 3)
 Maxi Anderson – background vocals (track 7)
 George Benson – guitar solo (tracks 8–10)
 Peggi Blu – sampled background vocals (track 7)
 Michael Boddicker – drum machine (track 2), M1 pads (10), synth pads (10), synth programming (4, 7, 9)
 McKinley Brown – background vocals (track 12)
 Ollie E. Brown – percussion (track 12)
 Jorge Calandrelli – synth strings (track 13)
 Tevin Campbell – lead vocals (tracks 2, 12)
 Ray Charles – lead vocals (track 4)
 Paulinho da Costa – percussion (track 10, sampled on 7)
 Andraé Crouch – vocal arranger, choir conductor, background vocals (tracks 2, 7)
 Sandra Crouch – choir conductor (track 2), background vocals (2, 7)
 Miles Davis – trumpet solo (tracks 8–9)
 El DeBarge – lead and background vocals (track 14)
 George Duke – keyboard solo (track 10, 11)
 Chad Durio – backing vocals (track 12)
 Sheila E. – timbales solo (track 11)
 Nathan East – bass guitar (track 9)
 Geary Lanier Faggett – background vocals (track 7)
 Vonciele Faggett – background vocals (tracks 2, 7)
 Ella Fitzgerald – lead vocals (tracks 6, 8–9)
 Kenneth Ford – background vocals (track 12)
 Jania Foxworth – background vocals (track 12)
 Siedah Garrett – lead vocals (tracks 3, 6–7, 11), background vocals (tracks 3, 11, 14, sampled on 7, additional on 4), choir director (12)
 Tammi Gibson – background vocals (tracks 2, 7)
 Dizzy Gillespie – trumpet solo (tracks 8–9)
 James Gilstrap – background vocals (track 4)
 J. C. Gomez – African percussion (track 2)
 Jackie Gouche – background vocals (track 7)
 Gary Grant – trumpet (track 9)
 Reginale Green – background vocals (track 12)
 Herbie Hancock – keyboard solo (tracks 3, 7, 10), synth pads (10)
 Alex Harris – background vocals (track 12)
 Howard Hewett – sampled background vocals (track 7)
 Jerry Hey – trumpet (track 9), additional keyboards (7)
 Jennifer Holliday – sampled background vocals (track 7)
 Pattie Howard – sampled background vocals (track 7)
 Ice-T – rap (track 2)
 James Ingram – lead vocals (track 14), additional background vocals (4), sampled background vocals (7)
 Jesse Jackson – narrator (track 2)
 Paul Jackson Jr. – sampled guitar (track 7)
 Al Jarreau – vocals (track 6)
 George Johnson – guitar (track 4), sampled background vocals (4)
 Louis Johnson – Moog synth bass (tracks 2, 4), bass guitar (2, 4, sampled on 7), sampled background vocals (4)
 Tiffany Johnson – background vocals (track 12)
 Jean Johnson-McRath – background vocals (tracks 2, 7)
 Big Daddy Kane – rap (vocals) (tracks 2, 8
 Randy Kerber – keyboards (track 12), sampled keyboards (7), sampled synthesizer (7), synth bass (12)
 Chaka Khan – lead vocals (tracks 4, 7)
 Michael Landau – sampled guitar (track 7)
 Rhett Lawrence – Fairlight bass and analog guitar synthesizer (track 7)
 Edie Lehman – background vocals (tracks 6, 7)
 Steve Lukather – guitar (tracks 12, 14)
 Clif Magness – sampled background vocals (track 7)
 Harvey Mason Sr. – drums (track 4)
 Donovan McCrary – background vocals (track 12)
 Howard McCrary – background vocals (tracks 2, 7)
 Bobby McFerrin – vocals, additional percussion (track 6)
 Melle Mel – rap (track 2)
 Kool Moe Dee – rap (tracks 2, 8)
 James Moody – alto saxophone solo (tracks 8–9)
 Perry Morgan – background vocals (tracks 2, 7)
 David Paich – keyboards (tracks 4, 10, additional on 7)
 Phil Perry – additional background vocals (track 4)
 Tyren Perry – background vocals (track 12)
 Greg Phillinganes – keyboards (tracks 2, 4, 10–11), Fender Rhodes (12, 14)
 Steve Porcaro – synth programming (tracks 2, 4, 7, 10)
 Ian Prince – keyboards (tracks 3–4, 9–11), vocoder (6), background vocals (3)
 Bill Reichenbach Jr. – trombone (track 9)
 John Robinson – drums (tracks 12, 14, sampled on 7)
 Derrick Schofield – background vocals (track 7)
 Caiphus Semenya – background vocals (track 2)
 Shane Shoaf – background vocals (track 12)
 Alfie Silas – background vocals (tracks 2, 7)
 Neil Stubenhaus – bass guitar (14)
 Rose Stone – choir director (track 12), background vocals (2, 7)
 Bill Summers – percussion (track 8, African on 2, additional on 7), hindewhu
 Al B. Sure! – lead and background vocals (track 14)
 Bruce Swedien – recording engineer (all tracks), mixing (all tracks), kick & snare drums (tracks 4, 14)
 Take 6 – background vocals (tracks 1, 6, 10)
 Rod Temperton – drum machine (tracks 1–2), handclaps (2, 6, 9)
 Ian Underwood – handclaps (tracks 2, 6, 9), synth programming (3–4, 10)
 Luther Vandross – sampled background vocals (track 7)
 Sarah Vaughan – lead vocals (tracks 6, 8–10)
 Mervyn Warren – background vocals (tracks 1, 6, 10), voices (5)
 Dionne Warwick – sampled background vocals (track 7)
 Barry White – lead vocals (track 14)
 Larry Williams – saxophone (track 9), keyboards (9, 13–14, sampled on 7), sampled synthesizer (7), synth programming (3–4, 11, 13–14)
 Syreeta Wright – sampled background vocals (track 4)
 Charity Young – background vocals (track 12)
 Michael C. Young – synth programming (track 9)
 Joe Zawinul – synthesizer solo (tracks 2, 8), sampled synthesizer (9)

See also 
 List of number-one R&B albums of 1990 (U.S.)

Notes

References 

Quincy Jones albums
1989 albums
Grammy Award for Album of the Year
Albums produced by Quincy Jones
Albums arranged by Quincy Jones
Qwest Records albums
New jack swing albums
Grammy Award for Best Engineered Album, Non-Classical